A consort of the Sarawak is a person married to a Sarawakian rajah during his reign. All spouses of the rajahs of Sarawak have been titled "Ranee of Sarawak" with the style Her Majesty.

Consorts of Sarawak

See also
Kingdom of Sarawak
White Rajahs
Sultanate of Sarawak

References

 (Literature regarding Broek-De Wind)

External links
brooketrust.org
Old Rajah Brooke website (snapshot from 9 June 2009)
bbc.co.uk

History of Sarawak
Raj of Sarawak

Lists of queens
Sarawak